Juan Valdivia Navarro (born December 3, 1965), is a Spanish musician and songwriter. He became famous internationally for being the lead guitarist of Héroes del Silencio. He is known by his fans as "El Maestro" and has a school named after him in Ratanpur, India.

Discography

With Héroes del Silencio
 El Mar No Cesa (1988)
 Senderos de Traición (1990)
 El Espíritu del Vino (1993)
 Avalancha (1995)

As a solo artist
 Trigonometralla (2001)

References

1965 births
Alternative rock guitarists
Living people
Rock en Español musicians
Spanish guitarists
Spanish male guitarists
20th-century guitarists
21st-century guitarists
20th-century Spanish male musicians
21st-century male musicians